Jesús María Satrústegui Azpiroz (born 12 February 1954) is a Spanish retired footballer who played as a striker.

Club career
Satrústegui was born in Pamplona, Navarre. However, he played his entire professional career in the Basque Country, solely representing Real Sociedad. With the team, he scored 133 La Liga goals – a club record that stood for several decades – in 297 matches, contributing solidly to their league wins in 1981 and 1982, totalling 29 goals while playing alongside the likes of namesake Jesús María Zamora.

After a serious knee injury in a match against Real Zaragoza in November 1982 (meniscus, anterior cruciate ligament), Satrústegui never fully recovered and retired at the end of the 1985–86 season, aged 32.

International career
Satrústegui earned 32 caps and scored eight goals for the Spain national team, and represented his country at UEFA Euro 1980 and the 1982 FIFA World Cup, retiring from international play immediately after the last second group stage game, a 0–0 draw against England – this would also be Zamora's last appearance.

Career statistics
Scores and results list Spain's goal tally first, score column indicates score after each Satrústegui goal.

Honours
Real Sociedad
La Liga: 1980–81, 1981–82
Supercopa de España: 1982

See also
List of one-club men

References

External links

1954 births
Living people
Spanish footballers
Footballers from Pamplona
Association football forwards
La Liga players
Tercera División players
Real Sociedad B footballers
Real Sociedad footballers
Spain youth international footballers
Spain under-21 international footballers
Spain amateur international footballers
Spain international footballers
UEFA Euro 1980 players
1982 FIFA World Cup players
Basque Country international footballers